Pong-Tamale is a community in the Savelugu-Nanton District in the Northern Region of Ghana. It is a less populated community with nucleated settlement. People in the community are predominantly farmers. It is served with a veterinary college and a Senior School. Pong Tamale is believed to be the Tamale to a community called pong which is close to it.

References 

Communities in Ghana